E58 may refer to:
 European route E58
 Okinawa Expressway and Naha Airport Expressway, route E58 in Japan
 Nimzo-Indian Defense, Encyclopaedia of Chess Openings code
e-58, network in Virginia, USA